The 2019–20 FA Women's National League Plate is the sixth running of the competition, which began in 2014. It is the secondary League Cup competition run by the FA Women's National League (FA WNL), and is run in parallel with the league's primary League Cup competition, the National League Cup.

The teams that take part in the WNL plate are decided after the determining round of the WNL Cup. The winners of determining round matches continue in the WNL Cup, while the losers move into the WNL Plate. Seventy of the 71 National League clubs were included in the determining round draw, with Larkhall Athletic being granted a bye due to there being an odd number of teams in the competition. Hounslow withdrew from the competition after the draw, meaning 34 teams were entered into this season's WNL plate.

West Bromwich Albion are the reigning champions, having defeated Liverpool Feds 5–1 in the 2018–19 final.

Results
All results listed are published by The Football Association. Games are listed by round in date order, and then in alphabetical order of the home team where matches were played on the same day.

The division each team play in is indicated in brackets after their name: (S)=Southern Division; (N)=Northern Division; (SW1)=Division One South West; (SE1)=Division One South East; (M1)=Division One Midlands; (N1)=Division One North.

Preliminary round
Thirty-four teams entered the competition after losing in the League Cup determining round, sixteen of which were in the southern section and eighteen in the northern section. This meant that two preliminary matches were required so that sixteen teams from each area could play in the first round.

Northern section

First round

Northern section

Southern section

Second round

Northern section

Southern section

Quarter-finals

Northern section

Southern section

Semi-finals

Final

References

FA Women's National League Plate
National League Plate